Aleksandar Radović (born 24 February 1987) is a water polo player of Montenegro. Radović competed at the 2012 Summer Olympics Radović was part of the Montenegrin team at the  2015 World Aquatics Championships. Radović competed at the 2016 Summer Olympics.

Further reading 
 Olympic Statistics (French)
 Radvić on BBC (2012 Summer Olympics)
 Water Polo World
 Men's Journal
 Swimming World Magazine
 Water Polo: Team GB finish with fifth successive defeat

See also
 Montenegro at the 2015 World Aquatics Championships

References

External links
 

Olympic water polo players of Montenegro
Water polo players at the 2012 Summer Olympics
Montenegrin male water polo players
Living people
Sportspeople from Pančevo
1987 births
Water polo players at the 2016 Summer Olympics
Mediterranean Games medalists in water polo
Mediterranean Games bronze medalists for Montenegro
Competitors at the 2018 Mediterranean Games